A General Map of the World, or Terraqueous Globe, full title: A General Map of the World, or Terraqueous Globe with all the New Discoveries and Marginal Delineations, Containing the Most Interesting Particulars in the Solar, Starry and Mundane System, is a general map of the world, or terraqueous globe with all the new discoveries and marginal delineations, containing interesting particulars in the solar, starry and mundane system by Samuel Dunn and Thomas Kitchin in 1794. The map features star charts, a map of the Moon, a map of the Solar System, and numerous other features along with maps of both hemispheres of the Earth. Samuel Dunn's map is large and includes much detail, and is challenging to fully describe it in small photographs or text.

Map details 
The primary map is surrounded on all sides by detailed scientific calculations and descriptions as well as Northern and Southern Hemisphere star charts, a map of the Moon, a latitude and longitude analemma chart, a map of the Solar System, a mercator projection of the Earth, an analemma projection, a seasonal chart, a universal scale chart, and numerous smaller diagrams depicting planets and mathematical systems. All text is in English. The survey of this map starts in North America, much of which was, even in 1794, largely unknown.

This map follows shortly after the explorations of captain James Cook in the Arctic and Pacific Northwest, so the general outline of the continent is known. However, when this map was made, few inland expeditions had extended westward beyond the Mississippi. This map notes two separate speculative courses for the apocryphal river of the west, a northern route extending from lake Winnipeg and a southern route passing south of Winnipeg through Pike's lake. The River of the West was hopeful dream of French and English explorers who were searching for a water passage through North America to the Pacific. In concept, should such a route be found, it would have become an important trade artery allowing the British and French, whose colonies dominated the eastern parts of North America, to compete with the Spanish for control of the lucrative Asia-Pacific trade. These earlier speculative cartographers didn't realize that the bulk of the Rocky Mountains stood between them and their plans. The kingdom of Quivira, which is one of the lands associated with Spanish legends of the Seven Cities of Gold is located slightly south of the western rivers.

See also

 Ancient world maps
 Cartography
 City maps
 Geographic information system
 Here be dragons
 List of cartographers
 Map projection
 Mappa mundi
 Pictorial maps
 List of historical maps
 Terra incognita
 Web mapping
 World map

References

 The History of Cartography Project at the University of Wisconsin, a comprehensive research project in the history of maps and mapping
 The history of cartography at the School of Mathematics and Statistics, University of St. Andrews, Scotland
 Mapping History - a learning resource from the British Library
 Modern Medieval Map Myths: The Flat World, Ancient Sea-Kings, and Dragons
 Concise Bibliography of the History of Cartography, Newberry Library
 Newberry Library Cartographic Catalog : map catalog and bibliography of the history of cartography
 American Geographical Society Library Digital Map Collection
See Map for more links to historical maps; however, most of the largest sites are listed at the sites linked below.
 Eratosthenes Map of the Earth, and Measuring of its Circumference at Convergence
  A listing of over 5000 websites describing holdings of manuscripts, archives, rare books, historical photographs, and other primary sources for the research scholar.

External links

 www.geographicus.com

Historic maps of the world
18th-century maps and globes